Mario Tullio Montano (7 February 1944 – 27 July 2017) was an Italian fencer. He won a gold medal in the team sabre event at the 1972 Summer Olympics and a silver in the same event at the 1976 Summer Olympics.

He died on 27 July 2017 at the age of 73.

References

External links
 

1944 births
2017 deaths
Italian male fencers
Olympic fencers of Italy
Fencers at the 1972 Summer Olympics
Fencers at the 1976 Summer Olympics
People from Pistoia
Olympic gold medalists for Italy
Olympic silver medalists for Italy
Olympic medalists in fencing
Medalists at the 1972 Summer Olympics
Medalists at the 1976 Summer Olympics
Universiade medalists in fencing
Universiade bronze medalists for Italy
Medalists at the 1967 Summer Universiade
Sportspeople from the Province of Pistoia
20th-century Italian people